Stéphane Robert was the defending champion, but he chose not to compete this year.Rubén Ramírez Hidalgo won in the final 6–3, 6–2 against Filip Krajinović.

Seeds

Draw

Finals

Top half

Bottom half

References
Main Draw
Qualifying Singles

Kosice Open - Singles
2010 Singles